Alfred Noyes Abbott (November 2, 1862 – September 14, 1929) was an American farmer and politician.

Abbott was born in Ustick Township, Whiteside County, Illinois. He graduated from University of Illinois at Urbana–Champaign in 1885 and was a farmer. He served as a justice of the peace for Ustick Township and was a Republican. He served in the Illinois House of Representatives from 1899 to 1903 and from 1911 to 1915.

Abbott died from a stroke at Jane Lamb Hospital in Clinton, Iowa.

References

External links

1862 births
1929 deaths
People from Whiteside County, Illinois
University of Illinois Urbana-Champaign alumni
Farmers from Illinois
Republican Party members of the Illinois House of Representatives